The 2005 Kia Cup, southern Ontario men's provincial curling championship was held February 6–13 at the Iroquois Park Sports Centre in Whitby, Ontario.  The winning team of Wayne Middaugh would represent Ontario at the 2005 Tim Hortons Brier in Edmonton, Alberta.

Teams

Standings

Playoffs

Sources
Kia Cup - Coverage on curlingzone.com

Ontario Kia Cup
Ontario Tankard
Sport in Whitby, Ontario
Kia Cup
Ontario Kia Cup